Branislav Sluka (born 23 January 1999) is a Slovak professional footballer who plays as a left-back for Dynamo České Budějovice on loan from Žilina of the Slovak Super Liga.

Club career

MŠK Žilina
Sluka made his professional Slovak Super Liga debut for Žilina against Nitra on 28 July 2018. Sluka had replaced Jaroslav Mihalík three minutes before the stoppage time. Žilina had won 2-1.

International career
Sluka was first recognised in a senior national team nomination on 28 May 2019, when coach Pavel Hapal named him as an alternate defender for a double fixture in June - a home friendly against Jordan, to which 29 players were unusually called-up and a UEFA Euro 2020 qualifying fixture against Azerbaijan, played away on 11 June 2019. He also featured as an alternate under Hapal's successor Štefan Tarkovič, for example ahead of two international friendly fixtures against Norway and Finland in March 2022. In December 2022, Sluka was first shortlisted in the nomination by Francesco Calzona, who joined the team in late summer, for senior national team prospective players' training camp at NTC Senec.

References

External links
 MŠK Žilina official club profile 
 
 Futbalnet profile 
 
 Ligy.sk profile 

1999 births
Living people
Sportspeople from Žilina
Slovak footballers
Slovakia youth international footballers
Slovakia under-21 international footballers
Slovak expatriate footballers
Association football defenders
MŠK Žilina players
MTK Budapest FC players
2. Liga (Slovakia) players
Slovak Super Liga players
Nemzeti Bajnokság I players
Expatriate footballers in Hungary
Slovak expatriate sportspeople in Hungary
SK Dynamo České Budějovice players
Slovak expatriate sportspeople in the Czech Republic
Expatriate footballers in the Czech Republic